Marinus Adrianus Koekkoek, known as The Younger (29 January 1873, Amsterdam - 30 May 1944, Amsterdam) was a Dutch animal painter, who specialized in birds. He is referred to as "the younger" to distinguish him from his great-uncle, the landscape painter, Marinus Adrianus Koekkoek, after whom he was named.

Life and work 
He was a member of the famous ; son of the cityscape painter, Willem Koekkoek; grandson of Hermanus Koekkoek, and great-grandson of Johannes Hermanus Koekkoek. His brother, Hermanus Willem, also became a painter; specializing in military subjects. His father gave him and Hermanus their first art lessons.

His career began and ended in Amsterdam. In between, he spent twenty years at the Rijksmuseum van Oudheden, in Leiden, illustrating academic works. He is best-known for his watercolor illustrations; notably Ornithologia Neerlandica: de vogels van Nederland, by Eduard Daniël van Oort, which was published in five parts from 1922 to 1935. He also created color plates for two series of schoolbooks on nature: In Ons Land, and  Buiten Ons Land. His last works were a set of postcards for Natura Artis Magistra, a zoo in Amsterdam.

In 2011, it was demonstrated that the posters were actually created by his son, who was associated with the National Socialist Dutch Workers Party. 

A species of snake, Malayotyphlops koekkoeki, on the Indonesian island of Bunyu, near Borneo, was named in his honor.

References

Further reading 
 P. M. J. E. Jacobs: Beeldend Benelux: biografisch handboek. Stichting Studiecentrum voor beeldende kunst, Tilburg 2000, 
 Old masters and 19th century art. Christie’s, Amsterdam 2012. Mit Familienstammbaum auf S. 122.

External links 

 More works by Koekkoek @ ArtNet
 Gerrit van Hezel: "Het schildersgeslacht Koekkoek en de Zuiderzee (1800 – 1956)", In: Schokland Museum, 11 March 2014

1873 births
1944 deaths
Painters from Amsterdam
Landscape painters
20th-century Dutch painters
Dutch male painters
20th-century Dutch male artists